Mad In Ukraine is the second album from the neo-rockabilly band Mad Heads. It was released in Ukraine and in Russia.

The tracks, "Sharks", "Corrida", "Black Cat" and "Treat Me Bad" appeared on  Ukraine-released compilation album Naykrascha Myt.

Track listing
" Invasion (Aliens in town)" - 3:21
" Radioactive Rock" - 3:15
" Black Cat" - 3:58
" Sharks" - 2:47
" Tram In Lunacy" - 4:23
" Undertaker's Party" - 3:53
" Summertime Rock" - 3:05
" Starbiker" - 3:02
" Treat Me Bad" - 4:23
" Come & be Mine" - 2:45
" Corrida" - 3:20
" Chernobilly Beat" - 3:08
" Ukrainian Horror Show" - 3:08

Video
Black Cat
Sharks

Personnel
Vadym Krasnooky – vocal, guitar
Maxym Krasnooky – doublebass
Bogdan Ocheretyany – drums

1998 albums
Mad Heads albums